Cruisin' is the third studio album by the American disco group Village People, released on September 25, 1978. Its title is a double entendre: it may mean just driving around or gay cruising.  Features the hits "Hot Cop" and "Y.M.C.A." which peaked at number two on the Billboard Hot 100.

The album was briefly rereleased in 2003 as YMCA in continental Europe.

Track listing

All songs written by Jacques Morali & Victor Willis.

 "Y.M.C.A."  – 4:47
 "The Women"   - 5:54
 "I'm a Cruiser"  – 7:03
 "Hot Cop" – 6:19
 "My Roommate" – 5:20
 "Ups and Downs" – 6:21

Personnel
Victor Willis – lead vocals and backing vocals
Felipe Rose – percussions and backing vocals
Glenn Hughes – backing vocals
Alex Briley – backing vocals
David Hodo – backing vocals
Randy Jones – backing vocals
Additional personnel
Jimmy Lee – lead guitar
Rodger Lee – rhythm guitar
Alfonso Carey – bass
Nathaniel Wilkie – electric piano/ clavinet
Richard Trifan – synthesizers
Russell Dabney – drums
Peter Whitehead – percussions
Bitter Sweet – hand claps

Charts

Weekly charts

Year-end charts

Certifications and sales

References

1978 albums
Village People albums
Casablanca Records albums
Albums produced by Jacques Morali